Andy Morse (born December 29, 1958) is an American professional golfer.

Morse was born in Boston, Massachusetts. He turned professional in 1984. Morse played on the Southern Africa Tour (now the Sunshine Tour) in 1988 and 1989 and the Nationwide Tour from 1990 to 1993 and 2000 to 2005. He also played on the NGA Hooters Tour where he won seven events from 1995 to 1999. Morse also won several state and regional opens in the northeast between 1986 and 1993.

Professional wins (16)

Buy.com Tour wins (1)

Other wins (15)
1986 Northeast Open, New England Open
1987 Northeast Open, New England Open
1989 Massachusetts Open, Maine Open, New Hampshire Open
1993 Massachusetts Open
Seven Hooters Tour events from 1995 to 1999

Results in major championships

Note: The U.S. Open was the only major Morse played.

CUT = missed the half-way cut
"T" = tied

External links

American male golfers
PGA Tour golfers
Sunshine Tour golfers
Golfers from Massachusetts
Sportspeople from Boston
1958 births
Living people